The grey-tailed mountaingem (Lampornis cinereicauda), also variously spelled gray-tailed mountaingem, grey-tailed mountain-gem, or gray-tailed mountain-gem, is a species of hummingbird in tribe Lampornithini of subfamily Trochilinae. It is endemic to Costa Rica.

Taxonomy and systematics

The grey-tailed mountaingem is treated as a species by the International Ornithological Committee (IOC) and BirdLife International's Handbook of the Birds of the World (HBW). However, the North American Classification Committee of the American Ornithological Society and the Clements taxonomy treat it as a subspecies of the white-throated mountaingem (Lampornis castaneoventris).

Description

It has a medium-length straight black bill, dark cheeks, and a white stripe behind the eye. Males have mostly dark bronzy green upperparts with an emerald green crown and a gray tail. Their chin and throat are white, the sides of the neck and upper breast bright green, and the lower breast and vent area dark gray. Females have entirely bright green upperparts and a gray tail. Their throat and belly are dark rufous and the undertail coverts are gray with white or buff edges.

Distribution and habitat

The grey-tailed mountaingem is found only in the Cordillera de Talamanca of southern Costa Rica. It inhabits the interior, edges, and shrubby clearings of oak forest and also gardens in communities near the forest. In elevation it ranges from  up to timberline.

Behavior

Movement

The grey-tailed mountaingem moves to the lower part of its elevation range after breeding.

Feeding

The grey-tailed mountaingem feeds on nectar from a variety of flowering plants. Males typically feed at epiphytes in the forest interior while females more often feed in shrubby areas. Males are territorial, defending flower patches. They are dominant over smaller hummingbirds and subordinate to larger ones like the fiery-throated hummingbird (Panterpe insignis). The species also feeds on small arthropods gleaned from foliage.

Breeding

The grey-tailed mountaingem's breeding season spans from October to April. Its nest has not been described but is believed to be similar to that of its close relative the white-throated mountaingem sensu stricto. That nest is a cup of fine fibers with moss and some lichen on the outside. The incubation length and time to fledging are not known.

Vocalization

The grey-tailed mountaingem makes high pitched calls described as "ziit or ziip" and also "a 'sputtery, bubbly' song".

Status

The IUCN has assessed the grey-tailed mountaingem as being of Least Concern, though it has a small range and its population size and trend are unknown. It is considered fairly common in the right habitat. However, "this hummingbird is potentially threatened by human activities" such as deforestation for timber and agriculture.

References

Further reading
 Stiles, F. Gary & Skutch, Alexander F. (1990): A guide to the birds of Costa Rica. Cornell University Press. 

grey-tailed mountaingem
Birds of the Talamancan montane forests
Birds of Costa Rica
grey-tailed mountaingem
grey-tailed mountaingem